The 12th Regiment Massachusetts Volunteer Infantry was an infantry regiment in the Union army during the American Civil War.  It was formed on June 14, 1861, in Boston, Massachusetts.  Its original commander was Colonel Fletcher Webster, son of the famed U.S. Senator from Massachusetts, Daniel Webster. The unit was known as the "Webster Regiment" after its first colonel.

Organization and early duty
Col. Webster began recruiting in April 1861 shortly after the attack on Fort Sumter. At that time, most recruits in Massachusetts were used to fill up the ranks in the existing state militia regiments, therefore it was several weeks before Webster had managed to recruit a full regiment. The unit was trained at Fort Warren in Boston harbor.  On July 19, 1861, the regiment was reviewed by Governor John Albion Andrew on Boston Common and presented with its colors.  On July 23, the 12th Massachusetts departed Boston for the war front.

The regimental surgeon was Jedediah Hyde Baxter, son of Congressman Portus Baxter.  J. H. Baxter later served as Surgeon General of the United States Army.

The regiment was first assigned to the Army of the Shenandoah under the command of Major General Nathaniel P. Banks.  Until the spring of 1862, the regiment was employed in uneventful picket duty in the vicinity of Frederick, Maryland. In late February, the 12th Massachusetts, as part of Brigadier General John Abercrombie's brigade, moved into Virginia. On April 18, 1862, while on picket duty along the Rappahannock River the men of the 12th Massachusetts exchanged sporadic fire with Confederates on the other side of the river.  This was the first time the unit was engaged in hostile fire.

At the Battle of Antietam, the regiment lost 67% of its strength, or 224 of 334 men. It was the highest percentage casualty rate of any Union regiment in the battle.

Notable members
 Colonel Fletcher Webster—son of Congressman Daniel Webster.
 Private John Edward Gilman, Company E - 40th Commander-in-Chief of the Grand Army of the Republic, 1910-1911

See also 

Massachusetts in the Civil War
List of Massachusetts Civil War units

Notes

References

External links
 

Units and formations of the Union Army from Massachusetts
Military units and formations disestablished in 1864
Military units and formations established in 1861